Charles Lloyd in Europe is a live album by jazz saxophonist Charles Lloyd on the Atlantic label recorded in Norway by the Charles Lloyd Quartet featuring Keith Jarrett, Cecil McBee and Jack DeJohnette.

Reception
The Allmusic review by Thom Jurek awarded the album 3 stars and states "Before his great quartet split at the end of 1968, Charles Lloyd took this band literally to the ends of the earth. As a quartet, they had grown immensely from that first astonishing spark when they toured the summer festivals in 1966. Here they are a seasoned unit, full of nuance, elegance, and many surprises, while having moved their entire musical center over to the pursuit of Lloyd's obsession — incorporating the music of the East into Western jazz".

Track listing

Recorded on October 29, 1966 in Norway

Personnel
Charles Lloyd - tenor saxophone, flute
Keith Jarrett - piano
Cecil McBee - bass
Jack DeJohnette - drums

Production
Meny Bloch - recording engineer
Stanislaw Zagorski - design

References

Charles Lloyd (jazz musician) live albums
1968 live albums
albums produced by George Avakian
Atlantic Records live albums